Agriocnemis is a genus of damselfly in the family Coenagrionidae.
Agriocnemis is distributed widely across Africa, South-east Asia, Indonesia, Australia and islands in the Pacific.
They are small insects, commonly known as wisps.

Species 
The genus Agriocnemis includes the following species:

Agriocnemis aderces 
Agriocnemis alcyone 
Agriocnemis angolense 
Agriocnemis angustirami 
Agriocnemis argentea  - silver wisp
Agriocnemis carmelita 
Agriocnemis clauseni 
Agriocnemis corbeti 
Agriocnemis dabreui 
Agriocnemis dissimilis 
Agriocnemis dobsoni  - tropical wisp
Agriocnemis exilis  - little wisp
Agriocnemis exsudans 
Agriocnemis falcifera  - white-masked wisp
Agriocnemis femina  - pinhead wisp
Agriocnemis forcipata 
Agriocnemis gratiosa  - gracious wisp
Agriocnemis interrupta 
Agriocnemis inversa 
Agriocnemis keralensis 
Agriocnemis kunjina  - Pilbara wisp
Agriocnemis lacteola 
Agriocnemis luteola 
Agriocnemis maclachlani 
Agriocnemis merina 
Agriocnemis minima 
Agriocnemis naia 
Agriocnemis nana 
Agriocnemis palaeforma 
Agriocnemis pieli 
Agriocnemis pieris 
Agriocnemis pinheyi  - Pinhey's wisp
Agriocnemis pygmaea  - pygmy wisp
Agriocnemis ruberrima 
Agriocnemis rubricauda  - red-rumped wisp
Agriocnemis salomonis 
Agriocnemis sania 
Agriocnemis splendidissima 
Agriocnemis thoracalis 
Agriocnemis victoria 
Agriocnemis zerafica

References

Coenagrionidae
Zygoptera genera
Odonata of Asia
Odonata of Africa
Odonata of Australia
Odonata of Europe
Odonata of Oceania
Taxa named by Edmond de Sélys Longchamps
Damselflies
Taxonomy articles created by Polbot